The North Carolina Coastal Plain National Wildlife Refuge Complex is an administrative organization that manages U.S. Fish and Wildlife Service wildlife refuges in eastern North Carolina. The complex includes"

 Alligator River National Wildlife Refuge
 Currituck National Wildlife Refuge
 Mackay Island National Wildlife Refuge
 Pea Island National Wildlife Refuge
 Pocosin Lakes National Wildlife Refuge
 Roanoke River National Wildlife Refuge

The complex headquarters and visitor center is in the Alligator River refuge headquarters on Roanoke Island.

References

External links
Eastern North Carolina Coastal Plain National Wildlife Refuge Complex page

National Wildlife Refuges in North Carolina
Protected areas of Bertie County, North Carolina
Protected areas of Currituck County, North Carolina
Protected areas of Dare County, North Carolina
Protected areas of Hyde County, North Carolina
Protected areas of Tyrrell County, North Carolina
Protected areas of Washington County, North Carolina